Gruppo TIM, legally TIM S.p.A. (formerly Telecom Italia S.p.A.), also known as the TIM Group in English, is an Italian telecommunications company with headquarters in Rome, Milan, and Naples, (with the Telecom Italia Tower) which provides fixed telephony and DSL data services.

It is the largest Italian telecommunications services provider in revenues and subscribers. It was founded in 1994 by the merger of several state-owned telecommunications companies, the most prominent of which was Società Italiana per l'Esercizio Telefonico p.A., (known as SIP), the former state monopoly telephone operator in Italy.

The company's stock is traded in the Borsa Italiana. Since 2017, the Italian State exercises on TIM the "Golden Power", which allows the government to take a number of actions when the strategic interests of the country are concerned.

History

1925–1964: Stipel and early mandatory phone tax
In 1925, the phone network was reorganised by the Benito Mussolini cabinet and the company Stipel was established in the same year. The original core of Telecom Italia included 4 companies: TIMO, Teti, TELVE and SET. Each of them operated in a specific geographical area. In 1964, these companies merged in one single group under the name of SIP.

1964–1994: SIP - Società Italiana per l'Esercizio Telefonico
In 1964, Società Idroelettrica Piemontese (SIP), a former energy company founded in 1918, ceased producing energy and acquired all of the Italian telephone companies, becoming SIP - Società Italiana per l'Esercizio Telefonico. It was run by the Italian Ministry of Finance.

SIP was a state monopoly from 1964 to 1996 and Italian people had to pay the "Canone Telecom" (a line rental charge of about €120 per year, plus hardware rental and other minor costs) in order to have a phone at home.

1994–2005: Telecom Italia, Telecom Italia Mobile and DSL services
Telecom Italia was officially created on 27 July 1994 by the merger of several telecommunication companies among which SIP, Iritel, Italcable, Telespazio and Sirm (companies owned by STET).
This was due to a reorganization plan for the telecommunication sector presented by IRI to the Minister of Finance.

In 1995, the mobile telephony division was spun off as TIM (Telecom Italia Mobile). Interbusiness, Italy's largest Internet network, was created and in the same period with TIN (Telecom Italia Net) and the first ISPs, internet access became a reality in Italy. In 1996, TIM introduced a new prepaid rechargeable phone card (GSM), and one year later launched short messaging service (SMS) capability. In 1997, under the chairmanship of Guido Rossi, Telecom Italia was privatised and was transformed into a large multimedia group.

By 2001, the company was in debt and was acquired by Marco Tronchetti Provera. The following year, the group released its DSL Flat service in Italy, Alice ADSL, with a download speed of 32 kbit/s and an upload speed of 8 kbit/s for €40/month plus a monthly based tax of €14.57, the "Canone Telecom", besides the mandatory monthly bills for home telephone numbers (a home telephone number was required for ADSL service). Telecom Italia Media, the group's multimedia company, was formed in 2003 from Seat Pagine Gialle, focussing its business on the television sector with La7 and MTV channels.

After the reorganization of editorial activities, in 2005 Telecom Italia acquired Tin.it and Virgilio from Telecom Italia Media.

The Telecom Italia Group also operates in South America; in Brazil as TIM Brasil, and in Argentina and Paraguay with Telecom Argentina Group. TIM Brasil has its local headquarters in Rio de Janeiro. Telecom Italia also had a 50% share in the Bolivian telecommunications company Entel until its share was nationalised by the Bolivian government in 2008.

2005–2014: Telecom Italia Spa acquired by Telefónica
Telecom Italia reported mounting debts in 2005, and, one year later, CEO Marco Tronchetti Provera resigned.

In 2007 the company was bought by Telco, a consortium of Telefónica and several Italian banks. 
Telefónica owned 46% of Telco, the holding company that controlled 22% of Telecom Italia.

In late 2013, Telefónica announced its intention to acquire the entirety of Telco by January 2014, potentially becoming Telecom Italia's largest shareholder. The plan, however, is being challenged by the Brazilian competition authority since Telefónica and Telecom Italia, with Vivo and TIM respectively, are the two largest telephone companies competing in Brazil.

2015–present: Rebrand
In 2015, Telecom Italia Group started a rebranding process of the telephony and mobile businesses under the single TIM brand. In the same year, the Board of Directors approved the new company's division, the Infrastrutture Wireless Italiane, or INWIT, which operates 11,500 wireless towers.

It was revealed in October 2015 that shareholders Vivendi would raise their stakes further in the company from its current level of 15.49%. As of May 2017, Vivendi owns 24.6% of the company with Vivendi's CEO Arnaud de Puyfontaine becoming Executive Chairman of Telecom Italia. Amos Genish is the new CEO since 28 September 2017 and he has been criticized to have fired 4500 Telecom Italia employees in June 2018. He has been substituted by Luigi Gubitosi that became the new CEO on 18 November 2018.

TIM

TIM, formerly Telecom Italia Mobile, is an Italian telecommunications company owned by Gruppo TIM. Founded as a mobile telephony company in 1995, since 2015 it has become a brand that provides mobile, fixed telephony, and Internet services.

4G is available in 6,849 cities (96.3% of the country). 4G+ has speeds of up to 180–225 Mbit/s exploiting the 4G carrier aggregation which is now available in more than 600 cities including: Rome, Milan, Turin, Naples, Florence, Genoa, Palermo, Catania, Bari and Venice. 3G 42.2 Mbit/s is available in 4,282 cities (84.2%).

TIM sponsors Serie A. TIM has a subsidiary in Brazil, known as TIM Brasil, with 72.6 million customers. The brand covers over 114 million customers worldwide.

Legal problems

Telecom Italia Mobile illegal charging money for "free" Internet providing renewals
Telecom Italia Mobile illegally charged money for Internet providing renew subscriptions for 5 years to its customers during the "free" subscription renewals.

Fraud in Brazilian prepaid mobile lines
On 8 August 2012, TIM Brasil became involved in a massive scandal in Brazilian news after the release of report by the Brazilian National Telecommunications Agency Anatel.

The report points that on TIM's prepaid voice plan (24.7% market share), called "Infinity" (in which the user pays roughly US$0.12 for each unlimited time call), the calls were intentionally dropped by the company, forcing the customers to make (and pay for) new calls to keep talking. In just one day, 8.1 million calls were dropped and the total profit was approximately $2 million. Upon release of the report, the Public Ministry of the Paraná State filed a lawsuit against TIM asking that it stop selling new mobile lines in Brasil and pay a multimillion-dollar fine for the damages against consumers.

Operations
The Telecom Italia Group provides phone landline services and mobile services in Italy, GSM mobile phone services in Italy and Brazil through its TIM subsidiary, (TIM Brasil), and DSL internet and telephony services in Italy and San Marino. It also operates in international telecommunication services for other operators and corporations, through its subsidiary Telecom Italia Sparkle. In 2013, the total amount of the company's debt was about 26 billion €. Telecom Italia has 66,025 employees.

Telecom Italia also controls Olivetti, a manufacturer of computer peripherals and mobile phones. On March 31, 2014, Telecom Italia led both the direct fixed access lines market with a 62% share, and the mobile postpaid segment with a 45% market share. In the mobile “prepaid” segment Telecom Italia owned a 31.5% market share together with Vodafone.

After the merger of Wind and 3 Italy, approved on August 6, 2015, Telecom Italia is now the country's second largest carrier with 30 million customers, followed by Vodafone with 25 million customers. Telecom Italia has preserved its leadership on the direct fixed access lines market and the mobile postpaid segment.

High Debt Issue
Telecom Italia Spa deals with a total debt of 27 billion Euro as of the end of 2019. Moody rated the debt with a B1 grade negative outlook in 2015.

Environmental practices and initiatives
In 2002, Telecom Italia subscribed to the United Nations corporate responsibility initiative Global Compact.
It is also member of a number of stock market indexes which include companies focused on corporate social responsibility, including the Dow Jones Sustainability Indexes and those administered by FTSE Group's FTSE4Good. Its part-owned Brazilian subsidiary, TIM Participações, is listed in the Bovespa's ISE (Índice de Sustentabilidade Empresarial) index.

Telecom Italia promotes a sustainability strategy including both environmental and social issues: in June 2014 it signed an agreement with A2A to buy energy only from renewable sources.

See also
INWIT
STET
Telecom Italia Tower (Naples)
TIM Brasil
TIM San Marino
TIMvision

References

External links

 
Mobile phone companies of Italy
Telecommunications companies of Italy
Companies based in Rome
Telecommunications companies established in 1994
Italian companies established in 1994
Companies formerly listed on the New York Stock Exchange
Privatized companies of Italy
Italian brands
Vivendi
Bolloré